Victorian Fury are an Australian netball team that represents Netball Victoria in the Australian Netball League. In 2008 they were both founding members and the inaugural champions of the league. They retained the title in 2009 and completed a three in row in 2010. They then won it four times in a row between 2013 and 2016. In 2019 they won their eighth ANL title. They are the most successful team in the ANL. Fury are effectively the representative team of the Victorian Netball League and the reserve team of Melbourne Vixens.

History

Netball Victoria
Victorian Fury is effectively the representative team of the Victorian Netball League. They are also one of two teams that represent Netball Victoria in senior or national leagues. Their senior team, Melbourne Vixens, have represented Netball Victoria in both the ANZ Championship and Suncorp Super Netball. In 2013 and 2014 Netball Victoria also entered a second team known as Victorian Flames in the Australian Netball League.

In 2016 Fury and Vixens began to host double headers against other ANL and ANZ Championship teams. This was part of a process where the relationship between the two leagues became more formalized. As part of this arrangement, a limited number of Vixens players were also eligible to play for Fury.

Three in a row
In 2008 Victorian Fury were both founder members and the inaugural champions of the Australian Netball League. Chelsey Nash captained Fury to their first title. In 2009 Fury retained the title   and in 2010 they completed a three in a row. Other members of the Fury team from this era included Kathleen Knott and Karyn Bailey.

Four in a row
Between 2013 and 2016 Fury completed a four in a row of ANL titles. Mwai Kumwenda was the top goalscorer for Fury during 2013, finishing the season with a record 461 goals. In the grand final against NSW Waratahs she scored 38 goals with a 97% strike rate. She was subsequently named the ANL's MVP. In 2015 Jo Weston, Kelsey Browne, Alice Teague-Neeld and Elle Bennetts were all members of the Fury team captained by Fiona Themann that won the ANL title for a sixth time. In 2016 Themann, again captain, and Bennetts were joined by Tayla Honey, Lara Dunkley and Shannon Eagland as Fury won their seventh title.

ANL Grand finals

Home venues
Victorian Fury play the majority of their home games at the State Netball and Hockey Centre. They have also played home games at Melbourne Arena and the Margaret Court Arena.

Notable players

Internationals

 Kelsey Browne
 Kate Moloney
 Caitlyn Nevins
 Tegan Philip
 Jo Weston

 Mwai Kumwenda

 Fiona Themann

Melbourne Vixens

Collingwood Magpies

MVPs
ANL MVP
The following Victorian Fury players were named MVP in the Australian Netball League.

Victorian Fury MVP

Head coaches

Premierships
Australian Netball League
Winners: 2008, 2009, 2010, 2013, 2014, 2015, 2016, 2019: 8
Runners up: 2011, 2017: 2

References

 
Melbourne Vixens
Australian Netball League teams
 
Netball
Sports clubs established in 2008
2008 establishments in Australia
Netball teams in Australia
Australian Netball Championship teams
Sport in the City of Melbourne (LGA)